In the Street may refer to:

 In the Street (film), a 1948 film by Helen Levitt
 The 1983 release of the Village People's 1982 album Fox on the Box
 "In the Street" (song) by Big Star on #1 Record (1972)